Nong Kae railway station is a railway station located in Nong Kae Subdistrict, Hua Hin District, Prachuap Khiri Khan.

2007 rail accident 
On 14 January 2007, Rapid No. 178 Lang Suan-Thon Buri collided with Special Express No. 39/41 Bangkok-Surat Thani/Yala (coupled together) at Nong Kae. The accident occurred at 02:30 am, and since the trains collided head-on, this caused 2 deaths: the train driver and the train mechanic. Many were injured and were sent to Hua Hin Hospital afterwards.

Train services 
 Ordinary 251/252 Bang Sue Junction-Prachuap Khiri Khan-Bang Sue Junction
 Ordinary 254/255 Lang Suan-Thon Buri-Lang Suan

References 
 
 

Railway stations in Thailand